Merrill Leroy Ellis (9 December 1916 Cleburne, Texas – 12 July 1981 Denton, Texas) was an American composer, performer, and experimental music researcher. He is most known for his work with electronic (analog) and intermedia compositions, new compositional techniques, development of new instruments, and exploration of new notation techniques for scoring and performance.

Education 
 1939 – Bachelor of Music, University of Oklahoma
 1940 – Master of Music Education, University of Oklahoma
 Graduate studies, University of Missouri

Ellis studied privately with Roy Harris, Spencer Norton (1909–1978), and Charles Garland (University of Missouri).

Career 
Merrill Ellis taught music theory and composition during the 1950s at the Joplin Junior College (now Missouri Southern State University) in Joplin Missouri.

Ellis founded the electronic music program at the University of North Texas College of Music shortly after he began teaching there in 1962. North Texas acquired its first Moog Machine for use in Merrill Ellis' studio, late 1965. Ellis was a pioneer in composing and performing live multimedia music on Moogs from the mid to late 1960s. He worked with Robert Moog to design the second Moog synthesizer ever made to be portable for him and his doctoral students to use during performances. Robert Moog gave a nod to Ellis by naming this second model the E-II. It was Moog's second synthesizer and Ellis' second Moog. In March 1970, a Tucson newspaper (Tucson Daily Citizen) mentioned that he had brought a Moog (smaller than the North Texas studio model) for a live performance of "Kaleidoscope."

The electronic music center at North Texas was one of the few in the southwest in the early 1960s. According to Ellis in a 1970 interview, Columbia-Princeton Electronic Music Center (in New York City) was the largest and oldest. Yale University, University of Toronto, and University of Illinois had prolific computer music labs, too.

The Center for Experimental Music and Intermedia (CEMI) at North Texas is an outgrowth of his accomplishments. When the College of Music designed and erected a new music complex in the late 1970s, a "new music" theater was designed and named "The Merrill Ellis Intermedia Theater" or "MEIT."

Selected compositions 
 Instrumental works

 "And Ruth Said," sacred songs (medium voice) with piano (Aug. 15, 1947); 
 "Brass Quartet," for 2 trumpets, tenor trombone, bass trombone (manuscript dated 1951)
 "Bridge Game," for string quartet; 
 "Cape "G" Melody," for oboe, viola, cello, with optional part for double bass (manuscript dated 1951)
 "Classical Combo," a septet + one; 
 Dizzy Kate Piano Suite, (Sept. 19, 1947); 
 "Introducing Kate"
 "Kate Was Very Modal"
 "She Sas Long and Slim and Loved to Dance"
 "Kate Lived at the Corner of 4th and 5th"
 "My, My, Dizzy Kate"
 "A Dream Fantasy," an intermedia piece; may use dancers if desired; for clarinet (some passages may be performed on saxophone), percussion, tape, and 2 reels of 16 mm. film; 35 mm. slides optional, C. Fischer (1976); 
 "Duets," for flute & piano (1969)
 "Ecce homo," for cello & piano (1970); 
 "Einyah [Festival]," for piano, trumpet, and percussion;
 Etudes for Piano, ("to Sis, Jan 5, 1951"); 
 Etude I:"Dorian"
 Etude II:"Phrygian"
 Etude III:"Lydian"
 "Fantasy for Organ" (1969); 
 "Five Plus One," for woodwind quintet – flute, oboe, clarinet, horn, and bassoon, with optional double bass (1969)
 "General William Booth Enters Into Heaven," for SATB chorus with instrumental ensemble, text by V. Lindsay (1954)
 "Incantations," for two pianos (1969); 
 "Mutations," a multi-media composition for brass quintet, prepared electronic tape, 16mm film projection and 35mm slide projections, Delaware Water Gap, Pennsylvania, Shawnee Press (1972); 
 for 2 trumpets, horn, bass trombone and tuba
 "Pastoral," for harp (1970); 
 "Pastoral," for & piano (1970)
 "Piece," for trumpet & piano (1950); 
 "Celebration," for flute, oboe, clarinet, bassoon, percussion, tape, lasers, and visual events (commissioned by Baylor University, Richard Shanley & Society for Commissioning New Music) American Music Center, New York (1980); 
 Dream of the Rode," for tape and 16 mm film;
 Premiered Nov 6, 1973, Montevallo University, Alabama; Marsue Burns, PhD (1935–2007), libretto; Carroll Young Rich, PhD (1933– ), Anglo-Saxon translation for the spoken parts (Marsue and Carroll were members of the UNT English faculty)
 "Feedback Fantasy"
 "The Great Gift"
 "Kaleidoscope;" 
 "Mutations," Shawnee Press, Delaware Water Gap, Pennsylvania (1972); 
 "Nostalgia," for orchestra, film & theatrical events; 
 "Oboe Quintet"
 "Organ Fantasy"
 "Scintillation," solo piano; General Words and Music Co., Park Ridge, Illinois (1976); 
 "Tomorrow Texas," North Texas Composer's Archive, Denton (1965)

 Opera

 "The Sorcerer," for solo baritone, tape, film, slides, and chorus (with optional live band); Shawnee Press, Delaware Water Gap, Pennsylvania (1973); 

 Film and television

 "The Choice is Ours," intermedia work for 2 films, slides, tape & audience participation

 Awards & honors 
 1962 — Harvey Gaul Prize, Friends of Harvey Gaul, Inc., and the Carnegie Institute of Technology, Department of Music, for the composition, Organ Fantasy, performed in Carnegie Hall
 1964 — Texas Federation of Music Clubs Competition, First Prize for "The Great Gift"
 1965 — Texas Federation of Music Clubs Competition, First Prize for "Oboe Quintet"
 1965 — Texas Federation of Music Clubs Competition, Second Prize for "Tomorrow Texas"

Ellis became a member of ASCAP in 1966.

 ASCAP Award for contributions in serious music; 1967, 1970, 1971, 1972, 1973, 1974, 1975, 1976, 1977, 1978, 1979

 Other publications 
 Electronic Music Composition Manual, Merrill Ellis, Robert Cannon Ehle (born 1939), and Robert A. Moog, North Texas State University (196-?); 

 Merrill Ellis Memorial Composition Scholarship recipients 

 1990–92 — Kurt Kuniyasu
 1990–91 — Gregory Alan Schneider
 1991–92 — Rick D. Chatham
 1991–92 — Michael Anthony McBride
 1994–95 — Steven Bryant
 1994–95 — Hideko Kawamoto
 1994–96 — Man-Mei Wu
 1996–97 — Lucio Edilberto Cuellar, DMA 2002
 1998–99 — J.T. Rinker
 1999–00 — Henry Vega
 2000–01 — Kayli House
 2002–03 — James Worlton
 2005–07 — Stephen Lucas
 2007–08 — Camilo Salazar
 2009–10 — Nicholas Kanozik
 2011–12 — Ryan Pivovar
 2012–13 — Jonathan Jackson
 2013–15 — Dan Tramte

 Selected discography 
 Louisville Orchestra – Jorge Mester, conductor
 Merrill Ellis, "Kaleidoscope," for Orchestra, Synthesizer, and Soprano – Joan Wall, soprano
 George Crumb, Echos of Time and the River †

 Unconventional Trumpet, music by University of North Texas (CD), composers Ellis, Beasley, McTee, Mailman, Austin, Latham, and Tull
 Crystal Records (2004); 

 Facets 2, John Holt, Trumpet
 Natalia Bolshakova (piano)
 Crystal Records CD764 (Dec 1, 2004); 
 Track 10 – Ellis: Trumpet Piece

 † Crumb, who shares the album with Ellis, won the 1968 Pulitzer Prize in Music for this composition

 Videos 
 "CEMI: 50 years of experimental music and intermedia at UNT"
 "Mutations"
 "Kaleidoscope", The Louisville Orchestra, Joan Wall, mezzo-soparano, Jorge Mester, conductor (1974)

 References 
General references

 Contemporary American Composers, A biographical Dictionary'' (1st ed.), compiled by E. Ruth Anderson (born 1928), Boston: G.K. Hall & Co. (1976);

Inline citations

External links 
 UNT College of Music Center for Experimental Music and Intermedia (CEMI)
 UNT College of Music Division of Composition Studies
 Merrill Ellis collection in the UNT Music Library

1916 births
1981 deaths
People from Cleburne, Texas
Contemporary classical music performers
American male classical composers
American classical composers
20th-century classical composers
Postmodern composers
Electroacoustic music composers
Experimental composers
American electronic musicians
American experimental musicians
Microtonal musicians
University of North Texas College of Music faculty
American music educators
Classical musicians from Texas
University of Oklahoma alumni
20th-century American composers
20th-century American male musicians